Luxemburger Volksblatt was a newspaper published in Luxembourg between 1880 and 1887.

Defunct newspapers published in Luxembourg
German-language newspapers published in Luxembourg
1880 in Luxembourg
1887 in Luxembourg